was a Japanese chemist and nuclear engineer.

Appointed as the first science attaché at the Embassy of Japan in Washington D.C. in 1954, Mukaibo played a significant role in coordinating the atomic energy agreement with the United States.

After returning to Japan, he became dean of the School of Engineering of the University of Tokyo. He served as the university's president from 1977 to 1981.

Mukaibo is considered a pioneer in the field of use of nuclear energy in Japan. He promoted nuclear power generation for his entire career and served as chairman of the Japan Atomic Industrial Forum from 1992 to 2000.

References 

Japanese chemists
Japanese nuclear engineers
University of Tokyo alumni
Academic staff of the University of Tokyo
Presidents of the University of Tokyo
People from Dalian
1917 births
2002 deaths
Educators from Liaoning
Engineers from Liaoning
20th-century Japanese engineers
Japanese expatriates in China
Japanese expatriates in the United States
Presidents of The Japan Association of National Universities